Ukrainians in the United Kingdom consist mainly of British citizens of Ukrainian descent.

History
In Manchester, the first documented evidence of Ukrainians was an entry in the Aliens Register in Salford of J. Koyetsky from Brody (then in the Austrian Kingdom of Galicia and Lodomeria) in 1897. Some 100 families settled in Manchester prior to World War I, and in the post-war years a community centre was established. An Information Centre was founded in London and religious and cultural links established with Manchester. In 1931, Bishop Andrey Sheptytsky and Fr Josyf Slipyj, each of whom in turn in later years became head of the Ukrainian Greek-Catholic Church, made a notable pastoral visit to Manchester. Elsewhere, the first generation of Ukrainian immigrants started arriving in the South-East, in particular, Hertfordshire in 1947 as displaced persons.

After World War II, work-permit schemes issued under the Attlee government (1945-1951) recruited Ukrainians to work in the mills of Lancashire and in the greenhouses of the Lea Valley (Middlesex/Essex). After a short stay in a transit camp in East Anglia, many individuals entered a displaced-persons camp in Newgate Street Village in Hertfordshire. At the camp, many young people became affiliated to the Association of Ukrainians in Great Britain, which had its headquarters in London; the Association acted as an important support-network for those separated from their family and friends.

After the end of World War II, more large numbers of Ukrainians (mainly displaced persons from camps in Germany) arrived in the UK. Ukrainians were integrated into the UK as European Voluntary Workers, while Ukrainian POWs from the Polish and German armies were also demobilised and settled in the major cities of the UK.

Geographers Graham Smith and Peter Jackson suggest that 35,000 Ukrainians arrived after World War II, and that by the late 1950s there were 70 established Ukrainian communities in Britain, "the largest in Bradford, Nottingham, Manchester and Coventry".

Russian invasion of Ukraine
During the 2022 Russian invasion of Ukraine, Ukrainians living in the UK have organised demonstrations to demand the British government introduce sanctions against Russia and take action against Russian oligarchs with financial and political links to the UK. Some of the protest organisers have criticised the government's Police, Crime, Sentencing and Courts Bill, which proposes to place new restrictions on protests and public assembly, accusing it of "hypocrisy for pushing through new anti-protest measures while criticising Russia for silencing anti-war demonstrations".

Population
The 2001 Census recorded 11,913 people born in Ukraine resident in the UK. The 2011 UK Census recorded 20,320 Ukrainian-born residents in England, 380 in Wales, 838 in Scotland, and 245 in Northern Ireland. The Office for National Statistics estimates that in 2020, 32,000 people born in Ukraine were resident in the UK. The number of Ukrainian nationals was estimated at 17,000.

Religion

Most of the present Ukrainian diaspora in the UK are of the Ukrainian Orthodox religion. A large number of Ukrainians living in Britain are Ukrainian Catholics, under the jurisdiction of the Apostolic Exarchate for Ukrainians in Great Britain, whilst smaller numbers are Jews and Muslims.

Notable Britons with Ukrainian ancestry

See also

 Ukraine – United Kingdom relations
 Ukrainian Youth Association Great Britain, a scouting organization
 Ukrainian Americans
 Ukrainian Canadians

References

Further reading

External links
 Ukrainian Embassy in London
 Ukrainian events in London
 Ukrainian Institute in London
 The Association of Ukrainians in Great Britain (AUGB)
 BBC Born Abroad - Ex-USSR
 Ukrainian Cultural Calendar in the UK
 Ukrainian Youth Association, Bradford
 History of the Ukrainian Community in Manchester
 The Edinburgh Ukrainians Website
 

United Kingdom
 
 
Immigration to the United Kingdom by country of origin